Nicolás Moreno (born 4 July 1928, in Buenos Aires, Argentina) is an Argentine former professional footballer who played as a forward for clubs in Argentina, Brazil, and Chile.

Clubs
 Banfield 1944–1952; 1953–1954
 São Paulo 1952–1953
 Green Cross 1955–1957
 Santiago Wanderers 1958–1962

Honours
Banfield
 Primera B Metropolitana: 1946

Santiago Wanderers
 Primera División de Chile: 1958

Individual
 Primera División de Chile top scorer: 1955

External links
 

1928 births
Living people
Argentine footballers
Association football forwards
Club Atlético Banfield footballers
São Paulo FC players
Club de Deportes Green Cross footballers
Santiago Wanderers footballers
Argentine expatriate footballers
Argentine expatriate sportspeople in Brazil
Expatriate footballers in Brazil
Argentine expatriate sportspeople in Chile
Expatriate footballers in Chile
Footballers from Buenos Aires